Abel-mizraim (’Āḇêl-Mitsrayim,; the "meadow of Egypt", or "mourning of Egypt") is a place "beyond," or east, of the Jordan river, at the "threshing-floor of Atad(גֹּרֶן הָאָטָד)." Here Joseph and his 11 brothers (representing the future 12 tribes of Israel) and the Egyptians mourned seven days for Jacob (Genesis ). Its exact site is unknown.

The name Abel-mizraim is only mentioned once in the Hebrew Bible.

Notes

Attribution

Torah places